Walter G. "Dub" Lamb (December 21, 1920 – January 5, 1991) was an American football end who played one season with the Chicago Bears of the National Football League. He was drafted by the Chicago Bears in the tenth round of the 1943 NFL Draft. He played in 11 games starting 3 and had one catch for 10 yards. He played college football at the University of Oklahoma and attended Ardmore High School in Ardmore, Oklahoma.

References

External links
Just Sports Stats

1920 births
1991 deaths
Players of American football from Oklahoma
American football ends
Oklahoma Sooners football players
Chicago Bears players
People from Ardmore, Oklahoma